The Groom Porter was an office at the royal court of the monarch of Britain, who had "the Inspection of the King's Lodgings, and takes care that they are provided with Tables, Chairs, Firing, &c. As also to provide Cards, Dice, &c. when there is playing at Court: To decide Disputes which arise in Gaming".  He was also responsible for "oversight of common Billiards Tables, common Bowling Grounds, Dicing Houses, Gaming Houses and Common tennis Courts and power of Licensing the same within the Citys of London and Westminster or Borough of Southwark."

The title may originally have referred to the keeper of the king's furnishings in his bedchamber. It was a position in the royal household, and therefore had certain privileges associated with it. In 1702 the remuneration was raised to £680 per year, which it remained until it was abolished with other sinecure offices at court in 1782. Eventually, the term became used for the owner, or operator of a gaming hall.

List of Groom Porters

Before 1660

 Nicholas Fortescue (died 1549), in a will made in 1544 describes himself as Groom Porter of the King's most Honourable Chamber. Will proved 26 September 1549. He is the grandfather of Sir Nicholas Fortescue the Elder.
 ?c.1547-1556 Edward Lewknor, Esquire (to King Edward VI and Queen Mary)

1660-1782
1660–1665: Sir Richard Hubbert
1665–1678: Thomas Offley
1678–1699: Thomas Neale
1700–1705: William Rowley
1705–1743: Thomas Archer
1743–1763: Charles FitzRoy (FitzRoy-Scudamore from 1749)
1763–1764: Francis Buller
1764–1765: Robert Wood
1765–1782: George Paulet

See also
Card games
Gambling
Casinos

References

Gambling terminology
Positions within the British Royal Household
Gendered occupations
1782 disestablishments in Great Britain